Metalloproteinase inhibitor 3 is a protein that in humans is encoded by the TIMP3 gene.

This gene belongs to the tissue inhibitor of metalloproteinases gene family. The proteins encoded by this gene family are inhibitors of the matrix metalloproteinases, a group of peptidases involved in degradation of the extracellular matrix (ECM). Expression of this gene is induced in response to mitogenic stimulation and this netrin domain-containing protein is localized to the ECM. Mutations in this gene have been associated with the autosomal dominant disorder Sorsby's fundus dystrophy.

See also
 TIMP1, TIMP2, TIMP4

References

Further reading

External links
 The MEROPS online database for peptidases and their inhibitors: I35.003